Nguema may refer to two different post-colonial leaders of Equatorial Guinea:

 Francisco Macías Nguema (1 January 1924 - September 29, 1979)
 Teodoro Obiang Nguema Mbasogo (born June 5, 1942).

The Nguema clan also includes:

 Armengol Ondo Nguema, the younger brother of president Obiang Nguema and head of the president's Israeli trained security bodyguards
 Teodorín Nguema Obiang, the favorite son of president Obiang Nguema.
 Patrick Nguema Ndong (1957-2021), Franco-Gabonese journalist
Also:

 CD Elá Nguema, a football club, from Malabo, Equatorial Guinea